Arkady Yakovlevich Inin, original surname Gurevich; born 3 May 1938, Kharkov) is a Soviet and Russian writer, playwright, screenwriter, actor, publicist, teacher and professor.

Biography 
  
He was born on 3 May 1938 in Kharkov, into the family of Yakov Noevich and Sara Abramovna Gurevich. He graduated from the Kharkiv Polytechnic Institute.

Carried away by the stage, he participated in the skits, in the games of KVN and, having worked as an engineer for eight years, entered the VGIK at the faculty of film dramaturgy.

The nickname (then the official name) Inin took in honor of his wife Inna, who died in March 2021 after 60 years of marriage.

Work 
The author of forty comedies (Yeralash, Offered for Singles, Private Detective, or Operation Cooperation, Weather Is Good on Deribasovskaya, It Rains Again on Brighton Beach), thirty books of humor, more than two hundred television and radio programs. Professor of VGIK. He was awarded the Order of Friendship (1998) and the Order of Honour (2009).

He advocated the ban of Moscow Pride in Russia.

References

External links
 
 Аркадий Инин на сайте kino-teatr.ru.
   Аркадий Инин. Прямой эфир

1938 births
Living people
Russian writers
Russian satirists
Soviet screenwriters
20th-century Russian screenwriters
Male screenwriters
20th-century Russian male writers
20th-century male writers
21st-century male writers
Soviet dramatists and playwrights
Russian dramatists and playwrights
Recipients of the Order of Honour (Russia)
Soviet Jews
Russian Jews
Kharkiv Polytechnic Institute alumni
Gerasimov Institute of Cinematography alumni
Communist Party of the Soviet Union members
20th-century pseudonymous writers
21st-century pseudonymous writers